Jeffery Matthews is a British artist, specialising in postage stamp design. He conceived the Machin definitive series' colour palette in the mid-1980s.

Biography
During his interior design study, Matthews was taught heraldry and letter typography. He then became an illustrator and created logotypes, graphic and typographic designs for public administration, firms and book covers. He diminished these activities during the 1990s.

At the end of the 1950s, Matthews registered to the Council of Industrial Design, which proposed graphic artists to client entities. In 1959, he was amongst the designers the Council proposed to the Post Office; the British postal administration was looking for the design of two stamp series to mark its 300th anniversary. He was then regularly invited to propose stamp projects. His two first postage stamps were issued in 1965 for the 20th anniversary of the United Nations.

The Machin series
In the 1970s, he became involved in the designs of new Machin definitive stamps, picturing Queen Elizabeth II's profile since 1967. When ordered, he designed new symbols for the Regional Machins in 1971, with new digits and letters.

Philatelic recognition came from his work on the Machin series colours. In 1976, he prepared the three colours needed for the photograved high value stamps. In the middle of the 1980s, he provided the Post Office with a large palette of colours, sufficient for the new next values. This work was honoured by a mini-sheet of eight stamps and two labels that Matthews designed, which were sold during the Stamp Show 2000.

Awards
Member of the Most Excellent Order of the British Empire MBE 2004
Rowland Hill Award for Outstanding Contribution 2005
Phillips Gold Medal for Stamp Design 2005

References and sources

External links
 Interview with Matthews published in The Chronicle, the journal of the Great Britain Collectors Club, October 2000. The first page is about the Machin series and the second about the Matthews' professional life.
Jeffery Matthews at 80.

Living people
Matthews
British illustrators
Year of birth missing (living people)